The Very Short Range Air Defence System, or VSHORADS is a Man Portable Air Defence System (MANPAD) or man portable surface-to-air missile developed by Defence Research and Development Organisation's Research Centre Imarat (RCI), located at Hyderabad. Multiple DRDO laboratories along with Indian Industry Partners are participating in the project. It is designed for anti-aircraft warfare and neutralizing low altitude aerial threats at short ranges.

Development   

The Indian army has been using Igla-M since 1980s. The system today is not well suited for evolving modern threats. In the year 2018, Russia’s Rosoboronexport came out victorious and was believed to supply $ 1.3 bn Igla-S missile system to the Indian Army. The 9K338 Igla-S (SA-24 Grinch) systems under the Very Short Range Air Defence System (VSHORADS) deal is still pending and under review by the Ministry of Defence (MoD) to reduced arm import and promote Make In India. However, The Indian Army has inducted a small number of Igla-S systems bought from Russia under emergency procurement. DRDO grabbed this opportunity and started working on its own very short-range air defence or VSHORADS program.

VSHORADS is designed and developed indigenously by DRDO’s Research Centre Imarat (RCI), Hyderabad in collaboration with other DRDO laboratories and Indian Industry Partners. The missile is propelled by dual-thrust rocket motor. VSHORAD missile incorporates miniaturized Reaction Control System (RCS) to increase mid-air maneuverability and integrated avionics.

On 11 January 2023, Ministry of Defence (MoD) accorded Acceptance of Necessity (AoN) to VSHORAD (IR Homing) missile variant.

Design 

Dual thrust motors provide propulsion and is designed to take out low flying targets. Missile and launcher is designed for easy portability.

Testing

On 27 Sep 2022, DRDO conducted two successful test flights of VSHORAD missile from a ground-based portable launcher from Integrated Test Range (ITR), Chandipur, off the coast of Odisha.  A Ministry of Defence statement read "VSHORADS missile incorporates many novel technologies including miniaturized Reaction Control System (RCS) and integrated avionics, which have been successfully proven during the tests

On March 14, 2023,DRDO again conducted two consecutive successful flight tests of VSHORADS missile at the ITR, Chandipur off the coast of Odisha. The flight tests were carried out against a high speed unmanned aerial targets, mimicking approaching and receding aircraft. The targets were successfully intercepted, meeting all mission objectives.

See also 

Trishul
Maitri
XR-SAM
Barak 8
Akash-NG
Akash
Advanced Air Defence (AAD)
Prithvi Air Defence (PAD)
QRSAM

References

Surface-to-air missiles of India
Weapons and ammunition introduced in 2022